Khristo Etropolski (born 18 March 1959) is a Bulgarian fencer. He competed in the individual and team sabre events at the 1980 and 1988 Summer Olympics. He is the twin brother of Vasil Etropolski, who also fenced for Bulgaria at the Olympics.

References

External links
 

1959 births
Living people
Fencers at the 1980 Summer Olympics
Fencers at the 1988 Summer Olympics
Sportspeople from Sofia
Bulgarian twins
Twin sportspeople
Bulgarian male sabre fencers